The Daughter of Rosie O'Grady is a 1950 American musical film directed by David Butler. It stars June Haver and Gordon MacRae. The story is mostly about the lives of musical performers in New York in the closing years of the 19th century. Most of the songs were written for the movie, but "Rose of Tralee" dates from the 19th century, and the song "The Daughter of Rosie O'Grady" dates from 1917.

Plot
At the end of the Spanish–American War in 1898, grumpy and overprotective Irish widower Dennis O'Grady (James Barton) has three daughters. The oldest, Katie (Marcia Mae Jones), welcomes her husband James Moore (Sean McClory), whom she has married in secret, home from the army.  The youngest two, Patricia (June Haver) and Maureen (Debbie Reynolds), pass a vaudeville theater owned by Tony Pastor (Gordon MacRae). Patricia recognizes the man from earlier that afternoon when he mocked her father, and she scolds him for his actions.

Dennis is advised by his friend Miklos (S. Z. Sakall) to warn his daughters about the immoral behavior of most men before it is too late. He is not aware of Katie's marriage and pregnancy, nor Patricia's flirtations with a vaudeville actor. Since the death of his wife Rosie – a famous vaudeville actress – Dennis has been wary of vaudeville, feeling that the hard life of vaudevillians was the cause of Rosie's death. When Patricia is caught by her father accompanying Tony, she lies that Tony is a college student. Dennis is impressed by the young man, and decides that he would be perfect to date Katie. Patricia is upset but keeps quiet, afraid of her father's judgment.

Patricia tells Tony that she is interested in joining him on the stage, but Tony thinks she should tell her father the truth. Dennis is outraged when he learns about Tony's connections to the vaudeville, and locks Patricia in her room, but she sneaks out to join Tony on the stage, where she quickly becomes a big hit. Dennis, meanwhile, learns that one of his daughters is expecting twins, and decides that Patricia must be the one. Devastated, he gets drunk and gets in trouble with the police. He disowns all his daughters – including innocent Maureen.

Lonely without his daughters, Dennis becomes ill. Patricia is informed by Miklos about her father's health, and quickly gathers her sisters and their lovers to take care of him. Dennis initially does not accept their company, until he finds out that Katie has just given birth to triplets. Afterwards, Patricia and Tony get engaged.

Cast
 June Haver as Patricia O'Grady
 Gordon MacRae as Tony Pastor
 James Barton as Dennis O'Grady
 Gene Nelson as Doug Martin
 S. Z. Sakall as Miklos "Mike" Teretzky
 Sean McClory as James Moore
 Debbie Reynolds as Maureen O'Grady
 Marcia Mae Jones as Katie O'Grady
 Jane Darwell as Mrs. Murphy

Cast notes
The role of Maureen was written specifically for 17-year-old Debbie Reynolds, and was her first speaking role in a film.  Director David Butler advised her to avoid "acting", and just say the lines the way she would say them herself. Another problem for Reynolds was physical: Because her ears stuck out from her head, they had to be glued back, but the glue had a tendency to come undone under the hot lights.  Reynolds' mother eventually solved the problem by having her daughter's ears pinned back surgically.

S. Z. Sakall is listed in the film's opening credits using his nickname, Cuddles Sakall.

Production
The film had been in preproduction for years before its release with the working title of A Night at Tony Pastor's. A 1942 article announced that George Raft would play the lead role.

Reception
Critics agreed that the plot of the film was uninspired, but some had a favorable opinion of the musical numbers. Bosley Crowther called it "a standard musical film" with musical numbers "both generous and likeable," but a plot that was "not only fake but formula-made." Variety called it "another one of those familiarly patterned musicals with a backstage plot. It has charm, some wit, nice music and good pace to fulfill all demands of the general market." Harrison's Reports called it "consistently entertaining" despite a "thin, commonplace story." The Monthly Film Bulletin dismissed the film for "indifferent tunes and slow-paced direction" as well as an "unoriginal" plot, with the "only bright moments" coming from Gene Nelson. John McCarten of The New Yorker wrote that the film was "about an aging horsecar driver who doesn't want his daughter to go into theatrical work, on the ground that slaving in vaudeville contributed to the death of his beloved wife. If the old girl's acting was anything like that of June Haver, who plays the daughter, she was probably a victim of justifiable homicide rather than exhaustion."

Box office
According to Warner Bros accounts, the film earned $2,158,000 domestically and $645,000 foreign.

References

External links
 
 
 
 

1950 films
1950 musical films
American musical films
Films about entertainers
Films about Irish-American culture
Films directed by David Butler
Films set in 1898
Films set in New York City
Warner Bros. films
1950s English-language films
1950s American films